ICEC may refer to:

Convention Center
Istanbul Lütfi Kırdar International Convention and Exhibition Center (Istanbul Lütfi Kırdar ICEC), a multi-purpose convention complex located in Harbiye neighborhood of Şişli district in Istanbul, Turkey.

Organizations
 InterCity East Coast, a railway franchise for passenger trains on the East Coast Main Line in the United Kingdom 
 International Cost Engineering Council, non-profit organization that promotes cooperation between cost engineering, quantity surveying and project management organisations

Science and technology
 International Center for Electronic Commerce, international conference on electronic commerce